Ushakovsky (masculine), Ushakovskaya (feminine), or Ushakovskoye (neuter) is the name of several rural localities in Russia:
Ushakovsky (rural locality), a khutor in Kolundayevskoye Rural Settlement of Sholokhovsky District of Rostov Oblast
Ushakovskoye, Arkhangelsk Oblast, a selo in Mikhaylovsky Selsoviet of Shenkursky District of Arkhangelsk Oblast
Ushakovskoye, Chukotka Autonomous Okrug, a selo in Iultinsky District of Chukotka Autonomous Okrug; for many years the main populated place on Wrangel Island
Ushakovskoye, Kurgan Oblast, a selo in Ushakovsky Selsoviet of Kataysky District of Kurgan Oblast
Ushakovskaya, Lensky District, Arkhangelsk Oblast, a village in Slobodchikovsky Selsoviet of Lensky District of Arkhangelsk Oblast
Ushakovskaya, Velsky District, Arkhangelsk Oblast, a village in Blagoveshchensky Selsoviet of Velsky District of Arkhangelsk Oblast
Ushakovskaya, Vologda Oblast, a village in Noginsky Selsoviet of Syamzhensky District of Vologda Oblast